The Pinacoteca Civica Fortunato Duranti is a museum in Montefortino, Italy.

The 19th-century painter Fortunato Duranti donated hundreds of items or art and furniture he had collected to the town of Montefortino. The remainder of the collection is displayed in the museum.

Paintings in Pinacoteca Civica Fortunato Duranti

Drawings by Fortunato Duranti in Pinacoteca

References

External links
Official website

Museums in Marche
Arts-related lists
Italian culture-related lists
Province of Fermo
Art museums and galleries in Marche